In the Donetsk People's Republic there is a system of vehicle registration plates. There are different plates for military, police, public transport, private vehicles, motorcycles, and various government ministries. The first batch of plates were released in May 2015. The design of the plates was used from May to December 2015, when the design was again changed. The Russian Federation began to recognize license plates originating from the Donetsk People's Republic and the neighboring Luhansk People's Republic in February 2017.

See also
Vehicle registration plates of Russia
Vehicle registration plates of Ukraine
Vehicle registration plates of the LPR

References

Donetsk
Donetsk People's Republic